Luisa Lynch del Solar (1864–1937), also known as Luisa Lynch de Morla from her first marriage and Luisa Lynch de Gormaz from her second, was a Chilean feminist writer, journalist, and socialite. She was the mother of diplomat , and the writers Ximena and Carmen Morla Lynch. In addition, she is the subject of the 1888 sculpture Madame Morla Vicuña by Auguste Rodin, which can now be found at the Musée d'Orsay in Paris.

Part of her literary output is known to be unpublished or scattered in newspapers and magazines – as is also the case with other feminist writers such as María Luisa Fernández, Sara Hübner de Fresno, and her own daughters. Her literary work is considered to be part of the early 20th century avant-garde that sought to massify feminist thinking and fight for women's rights. In this context, she participated in various women's organizations and institutions dedicated to art.

For some authors, her work can be framed within so-called "aristocratic feminism", along with other writers such as Elvira Santa Cruz Ossa, Inés Echeverría Bello, María Mercedes Vial, Teresa Wilms Montt, Mariana Cox Méndez, and Sofía Eastman.

References

1864 births
1937 deaths
Chilean journalists
Chilean people of Irish descent
Chilean women journalists
Chilean socialites
Chilean feminist writers